As in the human practice of veganism, vegan dog foods are those formulated with the exclusion of ingredients that contain or were processed with any part of an animal, or any animal byproduct. Vegan dog food may incorporate the use of fruits, vegetables, cereals, legumes including soya, nuts, vegetable oils, as well as any other non-animal based foods.

The omnivorous domestic dog was originally primarily carnivore but has evolved to metabolize carbohydrates, fat, and fiber and remain healthy on a diet lower in protein, with as little as 10% of calories derived from protein, of whatever source, for younger dogs, rising to 50% or more for older dogs. Research shows that dogs can remain healthy on a vegetarian diet.

In theory a vegan diet is also nutritionally adequate for dogs if properly formulated and balanced.
The American Kennel Club highlights risks factors of a vegan diet such as ensuring adequate protein intake, imbalance of certain amino acids, such as taurine and L-carnitine and potential vitamin or mineral deficiency. To offset these risks, supplements may need to be added to the dog's vegan or vegetarian diet, most importantly those that provide taurine, L-carnitine and vitamin B-12. According to this advice, dogs in the wild prefer animal-based protein, so matching their diet more closely to what they would eat if getting food on their own is more reliable for ensuring health. This dietary advice for dogs resembles that for humans on balanced vegan diets, where it is also important to ensure inclusion of essential nutrients, such as calcium, iron, iodine, and selenium and  vitamin B12 and vitamin D, possibly in the form of supplements, especially in pregnancy and early life stages.

Motivations for vegans diets include animal welfare and environmental impacts of animal agriculture. As of 2018, there are around 470 million pet dogs.

Vegetarian vs. vegan diet 
Vegetarianism may be defined as the practice of consuming foods that are primarily derived from plants, with or without dairy products, eggs, and/or honey. Veganism is a subset of vegetarianism, in which all animal-derived products are entirely excluded from one's lifestyle, including food, clothing, cosmetics, etc. Those who choose to practice veganism beyond vegetarianism typically do so because of moral, ethical, and animal welfare concerns. For this reason, people who practice veganism may wish to reflect their morals by having their pet maintained on a vegan diet as well.

History of plant-based dog diets 

The choice to feed dogs a vegetarian diet was first introduced in a home-prepared fashion in various countries, notably India. Since dogs are omnivores, it was recognized that they can thrive on both a meat-based or vegetarian diet. This diet choice was adapted to canines because of the ethical preferences of people who practice vegetarianism, as well as for pet owners seeking an alternative diet for pets suffering from food allergies, specifically animal-protein allergies. There are many published vegetarian feeding-regimens available to follow. As the popularity of this diet has grown with a corresponding increase in people practicing vegetarianism, there are various commercial vegetarian and vegan diets available on the market.

Dietary needs of the dog 

The dietary requirements of dogs differ based on a variety of aspects (i.e. age, level of activity, living environment, etc.). Rather than specific ingredients, diets are formulated for their specific nutrients, so every diet prepared must have adequate levels of nutrients, including: protein, fats, carbohydrates, amino acids (methionine, lysine, arginine, etc.), vitamins (Vitamin C, B vitamins, vitamin A, etc.), and minerals (calcium, phosphorus, sodium, etc.). Many commercially available plant-based pet food diets aim to meet the fundamental nutrient requirements of various dogs.

However, in a 2015 study of 26 commercial vegetarian dog diets available in the United States, 25% were found to not meet the minimum nutritional requirements as established by AAFCO.
In the conclusions of the study it is also said that "Vegetarian animals also experience a range of health problems, but these problems are also prevalent in companion animals maintained on meat-based diets" and that "a significant body of additional studies have demonstrated health problems in domesticated animals maintained on various meat-based diets."

Palatability 
Studies have demonstrated that a plant-based diet can be just as edible and palatable as animal-based diets for dogs. Odiferous ingredients that enhance the smell of the food increase palatability, and examples include nutritional yeast, vegetable oil, nori (seaweed), as well as spirulina. Additionally, certain ingredients can be combined to create a palatable flavour. An example is the synergistic combination of hydrolyzed vegetable protein and xylose, as well as a combination of substances derived from glucose, garlic powder, and nature-identical, non-meat chicken flavouring. The temperature of the food can also be a factor, as warmer food has an increased palatability.

Alternative sourcing of ingredients 
Due to the exclusion of animal products and by-products which are the primary ingredients of conventional dog food, many nutrients that would otherwise be provided by animal products need to be provided by replacement, plant-based ingredients. While both animal and plant products offer a wide range of macro and micronutrients, strategic formulation of plant ingredients should be considered to meet nutritional requirements as different nutrients are more abundant in different plant sources.

Primary protein 

A good source of protein provides a dog with a balanced and complete profile of amino acids, and is essential for growth, muscle maintenance, and various cellular functions. Conventionally, these amino acids are primarily provided through either a singular or a combination of animal meats, meals, and by-products. A vegan diet provides the same amino acids through plants such as legumes, peas, beans, nuts, seeds and grains. While all plants contain some amount of protein, some plant sources contain more than others. However, plant sources generally do not have as complete an amino acid profile, as they are often limiting in one or more essential amino acids.  Good sources of plant protein include chickpeas, green peas, soybeans, potatoes, rice, lentils, beans, and quinoa. In dog food, the protein composition can be sourced from a variety of ingredients, including grains, rice, corn, wheat, and/or barley. Soybeans, one of the most common plant-based protein sources in dog foods, provide a concentrated and complete protein source, meaning that they provide all the essential amino acids in adequate amounts. If soy is excluded for hypoallergenic purposes, chickpeas, green peas, rice, and potatoes are also common ingredients in commercial vegan dog foods. Nutritional yeast is another good source of complete protein, and can also be added to complement the amino acid profile.

Calcium 

Calcium is a micronutrient that is essential for the proper mineralization of bones, teeth, and intracellular signalling. The amount of calcium required by an animal is related to many other nutrients such as phosphorus intake, as it is important to balance calcium and phosphorus levels at a ratio of 1.2–1.4:1. Protein intake is also a factor, as increased consumption of protein leads to more calcium being excreted in the urine to balance out the nitrogenous waste products of the amino acid metabolism.

For humans, common food sources of calcium can be found in dairy products. However, dairy products are often not used as a conventional dog food ingredient, and therefore, calcium is typically supplemented as calcium carbonate or another compounded form. Although there are many plant ingredients that are high in calcium such as collard greens, soy, and other leafy vegetables, plants are generally high in phosphorus and relatively lower in calcium content. It is thus advised that vegan diets include a mineral source of calcium to ensure healthy functioning, and most commercial vegan formulas supplement calcium in the same manner as conventional dog food.

Vitamin D 

Vitamin D is essential for proper calcium regulation and is important for bone mineralization, nerve function, immunity, and intracellular signalling. Dogs are able to synthesize and convert 7-dehydrocholesterol (provitamin form of vitamin D) to cholecalciferol (inactive form of vitamin D) following exposure to UV light from the sun. Cholecalciferol is then converted to calcidiol in the liver before further hydroxylated to calcitriol, the active form of vitamin D, in the kidney. However, the conversion of provitamin D to cholecalciferol is significantly lower in dogs than other mammals, and is not sufficient to maintain an adequate vitamin D status. Thus, dogs depend on dietary sources of vitamin D to meet their nutrient requirement.

In the diet, there are two forms of vitamin D – cholecalciferol (vitamin D3) from mainly animal sources, and ergocalciferol (vitamin D2) from plant, especially fungi sources. Although both forms have been shown to raise serum calcidiol levels, there is evidence that cholecalciferol has a greater effect on raising humans blood calcidiol than ergocalciferol. There is also evidence that vitamin D2 is less effective functionally than Vitamin D3 in humans and especially in cats, although similar studies have not been replicated in dogs.

Vegan sources of vitamin D include ergocalciferol and synthetic or plant sources of cholecalciferol. Mushrooms are a good plant source of natural ergocalciferol, especially after being exposed to UV-B light. Cholecalciferol in vegan dog food can be synthetic or naturally derived from lichen, a non-animal source of D3.

Vitamin B12 

Vitamin B12 is the only vitamin not present in plant sources. The largest and most complex of all the vitamins, vitamin B12, is synthesized only by bacteria and some archaea species, as eukaryotes lack the enzyme. It is integral to the health and function of the nervous system, key in hematopoiesis, as well as required to synthesize methionine and catabolize propionate for energy. Grazing animals are able to obtain B12 when they ingest bits of soil with the grass, as the vitamin and B12-producing bacteria are found in the soil and attached to the roots of the plants. After ingesting the vitamin, it is stored in the muscle and liver tissues of the animal, and subsequently passed on to the next level of the food chain.

As no animal is able to synthesize cobalamin endogenously, cobalamin should be fortified and supplemented in plant-based diets. While conventional dog foods have sources of B12 from their animal products (meats, organs, milk, egg, etc.), vegan dog foods meet their vitamin B12 requirement through pure supplementation. Nutritional yeast provides a good source of vitamin B12, as long as it is already fortified.

Taurine 

The sulfur-containing amino acid, taurine, is primarily found in meat and dairy products and assists in the uptake of calcium into cardiac cells, thus associated with proper myocardial functioning. Taurine is considered conditionally essential for dogs because they are able to synthesize it themselves when adequate concentrations of the other sulphur containing amino acids, methionine and cysteine, are consumed.

A low amount of sulphuric amino acids have been linked to decreased food intake, a negative nitrogen balance, and in growing dogs, stunted growth rate. Low levels of taurine increase the risk of developing cardiac conditions, namely dilated cardiomyopathy. Taurine deficiency can also lead to retinal degeneration, reproduction problems, gastrointestinal disease and decreased development and function of skeletal muscles and the central nervous system.

Plant-based diets may contain enough methionine and cysteine to meet AAFCO standards, but these values do not include the endogenous conversion to taurine. Thus, dietary supplementation with taurine is advised, especially for dogs susceptible to or diagnosed with dilated cardiomyopathy. Because taurine is only synthesized in animals, vegetarian and vegan products have to rely on a synthetic form. There should not be a significant difference in the bioavailability or efficacy of the taurine content in vegan foods, as most conventional food brands will also supplement their formula with synthetic taurine.

L-Carnitine 

L-Carnitine is an amino acid that plays a key role in energy production, and facilitates the transport of fatty acids into the mitochondria. Animals, including dogs, are able to synthesize L-carnitine from the amino acid lysine in the liver. However, carnitine synthesis may not be adequate to meet their nutritional requirements and may need a dietary source, where L-carnitine is obtained directly through diet. Sources of L-carnitine are predominantly from animals. Vegetable and plant sources have significantly lower amounts of L-carnitine compared to animal sources. There is strong evidence that L-carnitine deficiency is associated with an increased risk of heart disease, such as dilated cardiomyopathy. Consequently, it can be synthetically supplemented in dog foods.

Omega-3 fatty acids 

Omega-3 fatty acids are polyunsaturated fatty acids (PUFAs) that are essential for proper brain and cognitive development. They also play a large role in the production of anti-inflammatory eicosanoids, which has been shown to reduce the risk of cardiovascular disease and other inflammatory diseases. There are three types of omega-3 fatty acids; namely alpha-linolenic acid (ALA), eicosapentaenoic acid (EPA), and docosahexaenoic acid (DHA). Alpha-linoleic acid is an essential fatty acid, and is the form that is most common and widespread of the omega-3 fatty acids. Vegan sources of ALA include plant oils, nuts, flaxseed (linseed), and soy. While DHA and EPA are very important and have major implications in cognition, they are not considered essential as dogs are able to synthesize them from ALA. However, the conversion rate is relatively low, and supplementation of DHA and EPA is often helpful. Sources of DHA and EPA are also generally less widespread, and although most of the ma1rket sources of these PUFAs are from fish and fish oil, they can be sourced from algae for a vegan formulation.

Potential risks 
Vegetarian and vegan dog diets may carry some risks.

Alkaline urine 
Animal protein has a high acidic amino acid content (glutamic and aspartic acid); therefore, its nitrogenous metabolites that are excreted via the urine are acidic, making the normal range of a dog's urine pH 5–7. Plant-based protein is relatively lower in these acidifying amino acids, which can lead to urinary alkalization (pH > 7). Alkaline urine puts dogs at an increased risk of developing struvite crystals, dysuria, hematuria and obstructing the urinary tract, which can have fatal outcomes. Vitamin C, potassium chloride, DL-methionine, and cranberry (which promotes overall health of the urinary tract), as well as peas, brown rice, and lentils all promote GI health and urine acidification, and can be used to correct the alkalinity of urine. Acidifying ingredients should be used with caution because over-supplying a dog can lead to metabolic acidosis. Regular monitoring of the acidity of a dog's urine during the transition onto a plant-based diet, changes in the diet, and during periods of illness are recommended.

Homemade diets

Inappropriate nutrient profile 
There are many vegetarian and vegan recipes available but due to the extra attention creating a complete and balanced plant-based diet requires, many of these are insufficient in macrominerals such as protein, and microminerals that include vitamin D and vitamin B12. These deficiencies cannot be corrected by including specific whole food ingredients due to the volume they would have to eat to meet requirements, thus nutritional supplements are necessary. Supplements contain anywhere from 0–300% of the vitamins and/or mineral amount required daily when the suggested dose is followed. Some ingredient inclusions can also be detrimental to a canine's overall health. Onion and garlic are often included in homemade recipes regardless of their association with hemolytic anemia in dogs. Current recommendations are that all formulations and supplementation of alternative dog diets are made by a veterinary nutritionist.

Deviation from recipe instructions 
Obtaining precision and accuracy when following a recipe for plant-based diets is essential. Ingredient substitutions made over time due to affordability, availability, and owner and pet preferences, increase the risk of inadequacy. Each ingredient has a specific purpose of inclusion in a recipe; thus, substitutions may not be appropriate, especially if the diet was created for a medical condition. There are many ingredients that have been associated with disease pathologies in dogs and should not be added to a diet. To name a few, raisins, grapes, and sultanas have been associated with renal failure. Members of the allium family, including onion, garlic, shallots, and leeks are linked to the development of hemolytic anemia, and chocolate is associated with cardiac abnormalities and pancreatitis. A veterinary nutritionist can make suitable suggestions on altering existing recipes if concerns arise.

Inadequate feeding recommendations 
Feeding instructions for homemade diets often lack clarity. Improper or excluded caloric information and body weight recommendations increase the risk of energy over-consumption leading to obesity. Dogs can also be undernourished and develop deficiency symptoms. Vague feeding guidelines can contribute to poor weight management because ideal body weight values are not communicated to the consumer.

Potential benefits
There are only short-term studies and uncontrolled, low-quality case series evaluating the health of dogs that are fed vegan or vegetarian diets. Such limited evidence leaves significant uncertainty about the risks and benefits of these diets for domestic  dogs.

There is some research  that, in humans, the reduction of red meat intake and vegetarianism is associated with lower risks of colon cancer.  The World Health Organization classified red meat as carcinogenic (cancer-inducing) in 2015. However, there have been very few, if any, studies regarding  the role a meat-based diet has on the occurrence of cancer in dogs, and certainly none have been conducted that meet the standards of evidence-based medicine found in high quality randomized controlled trials.

Vegetarian and vegan diets may prevent dog cancer . A study of 144 female dogs found that feeding them less red meat, especially cow and pig meat, lowers their risk of mammary cancer. However, that same study also found that the risk of mammary cancer was lower in dogs fed diets containing poultry.

Nevertheless, a significant and growing body of studies and cases suggest that dogs may be successfully maintained and even thrive on nutritionally sound vegetarian diets long-term. Such diets have been associated with benefits such as improved coat condition, allergy control, weight control, increased overall health and vitality, arthritis regression, diabetes regression, cataract resolution, and decreased incidences of endocrine diseases like hypothyroidism.

Processing 
Processing is an important determinant of what nutrients a dog is actually able to digest and absorb. Plant-based ingredients can be very difficult to break down without proper enzymes in the animal's digestive tract to do this. Processing has the ability to break down nutrients such as insoluble fiber and protein that can aid in the digestibility of the ingredients and ensure the dog is utilizing the nutrients given to meet its requirements. However, processing can cause negative effects to these traits as well.

Processing of kibble – extrusion process 

Production of dog food kibble is done through a process known as food extrusion. Extrusion is a process commonly used in the pet food industry to develop a product that is porous or "puffed" from expansion of pet-safe ingredients. Food extrusion is the process of which high pressure and heat are used to both shape and evenly distribute feed ingredients.

Ingredients used 
Dog food ingredients typically contain farinaceous (starch) and proteinaceous (protein) ingredients. Farinaceous ingredients commonly found in United States dog feed are wheat, wheat middlings, oats, barley, corn, corn meal, hominy and other similar ingredients that account for roughly 35% to 70% of the total feed weight. Proteinaceous ingredients for vegetarian dog diets are typically from vegetables. Proteinaceous ingredients used in United States dog food typically take up 20 to 50% of the total weight of the feed mixture. Additional flavouring, colours, vitamin and mineral supplementation is added to complete a balanced dog food diet. Fat, from plant oils, is normally used to add both taste and texture to vegetarian dog diets in the United States.

Processing of canned vegetarian dog diets 
Supplementing with canned food is one way to add palatability and water content to a dog's diet. Dog canned food comes in two forms in the United States: stew style and pâté style, which can vary in moisture content. The desired type of wet food produced will determine the process needed for the development of the final product. The steps to producing a canned product involves the canning process followed by retorting (steam sterilization) seen in United States procedures.

Development of a replacement meat product 

Most dogs prefer a meal that is rich in protein, normally from animal sources. However, with vegetarian and vegan diets in the United States, this appealing taste is mimicked using plant-based ingredients.

In the United States, artificial fibers from edible vegetable protein are formed into bundles using an edible form of binding agent. This is then added to the diet mixture to form the appearance and texture of muscle meat fibers. To make this bundle more resistant to the strain of processing, a protective layer consisting of starch, gelatine powder, gelatine jelly, collagen flour, or gums is used. There should be between 0.1 and 30% of this layer coating the fiber bundles by its weight. When real meat is used in canned food processing, it maintains its form while still having a readily collapsible structure when under pressure. The technique of using bundle fibers mimics this characteristic that is appealing to pet owners. Protein fibers used should be 0.5 to 5mm thick with a ratio of fiber to emulsion that is between 80 parts fiber per 20 parts emulsion to 15 parts fiber per 85 parts emulsion. Carrageenan, fats, and other non-protein materials can be used to extend fibers. The emulsion may consist of agar, carrageenan, gelatin, carob gum, and edible ionic polymeric material such as sodium carrageenate, sodium polypectate, sodium caseinate, and sodium alginate

Nutritional aspects of processing 
Processing has both beneficial and detrimental effects on feed ingredients as it applies high levels of heat, and with extrusion, pressure with reduction of moisture content.

Protein 
High heat has the effect of denaturing proteins as well as inactivating anti-nutritional factors that decrease digestive abilities. With these characteristics, protein becomes more easily digestible in products that have been processed compared to those that have not. Specifically for vegetable protein, an increase in its nutritional value is seen due to this improved digestibility. In raw plant ingredients, enzyme attachment sites are more readily available when heat and pressure is used to inactivate enzyme inhibitors.

On the other hand, some amino acids can be lost with heat. Lysine, both a reactive and an essential amino acid, has low retention during processing. Loss of lysine also decreases digestible protein and thus, is thought to be a sign of protein damage in extrudates. Other amino acids such as cysteine, arginine, histidine, and aspartic acid have been known to decrease in availability due to the low moisture content during processing.

Carbohydrate 
During the extrusion process, sucrose is converted to reducing sugars that can be lost from Maillard reactions. Therefore, it is often seen that sugar amounts are decreased at this time. Oligosaccharides, such as raffinose and stachyose, impair nutrient utilization of grains. In the extrusion process there is a destruction of oligosaccharides that prevent flatulence and thus improves utilization of legumes used in the feed. Gelatinization of starches is a required step in extruding foods in order to form the desired porous appearance. This step allows enzymes to react with starch and increase starch breakdown.

Fiber 
Processing increases water solubility of fiber by reducing the molecular weight of starch molecules like hemicellulose and pectin. This conversion of insoluble to soluble fiber increases the total dietary soluble fiber amounts in the feed mixture by making fiber more susceptible to absorption.

Lipids 
Levels of 6 to 8% fat used in the extrusion process are not advised, as it limits the product's ability to expand. This is because fat causes poor pressure levels in the barrel due to more traction. If high fat ingredients are used, some free oil may be lost when product goes through the diet. Food processing can increase the nutritional quality of the product by minimizing lipid oxidation.

Vitamins 
Increasing temperatures, pressure, and screw speed from extrusion affects retention of vitamins such as β-carotene, thiamine, ascorbic acid and vitamin A. The lower amounts of moisture and variability in die diameter have been also known to cause this effect. It is recommended to add additional amounts of vitamins into the mixture before processing to counterbalance the loss of vitamins during this process.

Minerals 
Macromolecules are primarily affected during processing compared to molecules of a smaller size. Processing reduces various anti-nutritional factors that would otherwise impair absorption, which in turn improves the overall absorption of minerals.

See also
 Insect-based pet food
 List of vegetarian and vegan companies
 Sustainable food system
 Vegepet

References

Dog nutrition
Vegetarianism
Vegan pet food brands
Dog food brands